The St. Lawrence River is a large river in the middle latitudes of North America. Its headwaters begin flowing from Lake Ontario in a roughly northeasterly direction, into the Gulf of St. Lawrence, connecting the North American Great Lakes to the North Atlantic Ocean, and forming the primary drainage outflow of the Great Lakes Basin. The river traverses the Canadian provinces of Ontario and Quebec, as well as the U.S. state of New York, and demarcates part of the international boundary between Canada and the United States. It also provides the foundation for the commercial St. Lawrence Seaway.

Names
Originally known by a variety of names by local First Nations, the St. Lawrence became known in French as le fleuve Saint-Laurent (also spelled St-Laurent) in 1604 by Samuel de Champlain. Opting for the grande riviere de sainct Laurens and fleuve sainct Laurens in his writings and on his maps, de Champlain supplanted previous French names for the river including the Grand fleuve de Hochelaga and the Grande rivière de Canada, which was the more popular name of the river in the 16th century. The name Saint-Laurent (Saint Lawrence) was originally applied to the eponymous bay by Jacques Cartier upon his arrival into the region on the 10th of August feast day for Saint Lawrence in 1535.

Today, the river is still known by Indigenous nations by a number of distinct names. Innu-aimun, the language of Nitassinan, refers to it as Wepistukujaw Sipo/Wepìstùkwiyaht sīpu; the Abenaki call it Moliantegok/Moliantekw ("Montréal River"), Kchitegw/Ktsitekw/Gicitegw ("Great River"), or Oss8genaizibo/Ws8genaisibo/Wsogenaisibo ("River of the Algonquins"); the Mohawk refer to it in Kanienʼkéha as Roiatatokenti, Raoteniateara, Ken’tarókwen, or Kaniatarowanénhne; the Tuscarora call it Kahnawáˀkye or Kaniatarowanenneh ("Big Water Current"); the Algonquins (or Omàmiwininiwak) call it "the Walking Path" or Magtogoek or Kitcikanii sipi, the "Large Water River"; the Huron-Wendats refer to it as Lada8anna or Laooendaooena; and, the Atikamekw of Nitaskinan refer to it as Micta sipi ("Huge River").

Geography

With the draining of the Champlain Sea, due to a rebounding continent from the Last Glacial Maximum, the St. Lawrence River was formed. The Champlain Sea lasted from about 13,000 years ago to about 10,000 years ago and was continuously shrinking during that time, a process that continues today.The Saint Lawrence River is home to 1,864 islands and was given the name the 1000 Islands. 

Today, the St. Lawrence River begins at the outflow of Lake Ontario and flows adjacent to Gananoque, Brockville, Morristown, Ogdensburg, Massena, Cornwall, Montreal, Trois-Rivières, and Quebec City before draining into the Gulf of St. Lawrence, one of the largest estuaries in the world. The estuary begins at the eastern tip of Île d'Orléans, just downstream from Quebec City. The river becomes tidal around Quebec City.

These numbers include the estuary; without the estuary, the length from Lake Ontario is c. 500 km (c. 300 mi). The farthest headwater is the North River in the Mesabi Range at Hibbing, Minnesota. The basin covers parts of Ontario and Quebec in Canada, parts of Minnesota, Wisconsin, Illinois, Indiana, Ohio, Pennsylvania, New York, Vermont, and nearly the entirety of the state of Michigan in the United States.

The St. Lawrence River includes Lake Saint-Louis south of Montreal, Lake Saint Francis at Salaberry-de-Valleyfield and Lac Saint-Pierre east of Montreal. It encompasses four archipelagoes: the Thousand Islands chain near Alexandria Bay, New York and Kingston, Ontario; the Hochelaga Archipelago, including the Island of Montreal and Île Jésus (Laval); the Lake St. Pierre Archipelago (classified a biosphere world reserve by the UNESCO in 2000) and the smaller Mingan Archipelago. Other islands include Île d'Orléans near Quebec City and Anticosti Island north of the Gaspé. It is the second longest river in Canada.

Lake Champlain and the Ottawa, Richelieu, Saint-Maurice, Saint-François, Chaudière and Saguenay rivers drain into the St. Lawrence.

The St. Lawrence River is in a seismically active zone where fault reactivation is believed to occur along late Proterozoic to early Paleozoic normal faults related to the opening of the Iapetus Ocean. The faults in the area are rift-related and comprise the Saint Lawrence rift system.

According to the United States Geological Survey, the St. Lawrence Valley is a physiographic province of the larger Appalachian division, containing the Champlain and Northern physiographic section. However, in Canada, where most of the valley is, it is instead considered part of a distinct St. Lawrence Lowlands physiographic division, and not part of the Appalachian division at all.

History

Flowing through and adjacent to numerous Indigenous homelands, the large river was always and remains to this day a primary thoroughfare for many peoples. Beginning in Dawnland at the Gulf of St. Lawrence, the river borders Mi'kma'ki in the South (what is today known as the Canadian Maritimes), and Nitassinan in the North, the national territory of the Innu people. On the south shore beyond the Mi'kmaw district of Gespe'gewa'ki, the river passes Wolastokuk (the Maliseet homeland), Pαnawαhpskewahki (the Penobscot homeland), and Ndakinna (the Abenaki homeland). Continuing, the river passes through the former country of the St. Lawrence Iroquois and then three of the six homelands of the Haudenosaunee: the Mohawk or Kanienʼkehá꞉ka, the Oneida or Onyota'a:ka, and the Onondaga or Onöñda’gaga’.

In the early 17th century, the Huron-Wendat Nation migrated from their original country of Huronia to what is now known as Nionwentsïo centred around Wendake. Nionwentsïo occupies both the north and south shores of the river, overlapping with Nitassinan and the more western Wabanaki or Dawnland countries. Adjacent on the north shore is the Atikamekw territorial homeland of Nitaskinan and, upstream, the further reaches of Anishinaabewaki, specifically the homelands of the Algonquin and Mississauga Nations.

The Norse explored the Gulf of St. Lawrence in the 11th century and were followed by fifteenth- and early sixteenth-century European mariners, such as John Cabot, and the brothers Gaspar and Miguel Corte-Real. The first European explorer known to have sailed up the St. Lawrence River itself was Jacques Cartier. At that time, the land along the river described as "about two leagues, a mountain as tall as a heap of wheat" was inhabited by the St. Lawrence Iroquoians; at the time of Cartier's second voyage in 1535. Because Cartier arrived in the estuary on Saint Lawrence's feast day 10 August, he named it the Gulf of Saint Lawrence.
The St. Lawrence River is partly within the U.S. and as such is that country's sixth oldest surviving European place-name.

The earliest regular Europeans in the area were the Basques, who came to the St Lawrence Gulf and River in pursuit of whales from the early 16th century. The Basque whalers and fishermen traded with indigenous Americans and set up settlements, leaving vestiges all over the coast of eastern Canada and deep into the St. Lawrence River. Basque commercial and fishing activity reached its peak before the Armada Invencible'''s disaster (1588), when the Spanish Basque whaling fleet was confiscated by King Philip II of Spain and largely destroyed. Initially, the whaling galleons from Labourd were not affected by the Spanish defeat.

Until the early 17th century, the French used the name Rivière du Canada to designate the St. Lawrence upstream to Montreal and the Ottawa River after Montreal. The St. Lawrence River served as the main route for European exploration of the North American interior, first pioneered by French explorer Samuel de Champlain.

Control of the river was crucial to British strategy to capture New France in the Seven Years' War. Having captured Louisbourg in 1758, the British sailed up to Quebec the following year thanks to charts drawn up by James Cook. British troops were ferried via the St. Lawrence to attack the city from the west, which they successfully did at the Battle of the Plains of Abraham. The river was used again by the British to defeat the French siege of Quebec under the Chevalier de Lévis in 1760.

In 1809, the first steamboat to ply its trade on the St. Lawrence was built and operated by John Molson and associates, a scant two years after Fulton's steam-powered navigation of the Hudson River. The Accommodation with ten passengers made her maiden voyage from Montreal to Quebec City in 66 hours, for 30 of which she was at anchor. She had a keel of 75 feet, and a length overall of 85 feet. The cost of a ticket was eight dollars upstream, and nine dollars down. She had berths that year for twenty passengers.

Within a decade, daily service was available in the hotly-contested Montreal-Quebec route.

Because of the virtually impassable Lachine Rapids, the St. Lawrence was once continuously navigable only as far as Montreal. Opened in 1825, the Lachine Canal was the first to allow ships to pass the rapids. An extensive system of canals and locks, known as the St. Lawrence Seaway, was officially opened on 26 June 1959 by Elizabeth II (representing Canada) and President Dwight D. Eisenhower (representing the United States). The Seaway (including the Welland Canal) now permits ocean-going vessels to pass all the way to Lake Superior.

During the Second World War, the Battle of the St. Lawrence involved submarine and anti-submarine actions throughout the lower St. Lawrence River and the entire Gulf of St. Lawrence, Strait of Belle Isle and Cabot Strait from May to October 1942, September 1943, and again in October and November 1944. During this time, German U-boats sank several merchant marine ships and three Canadian warships.

In the late 1970s, the river was the subject of a successful ecological campaign (called "Save the River"), originally responding to planned development by the United States Army Corps of Engineers. The campaign was organized, among others, by Abbie Hoffman.

Resident whales

Sources

The source of the North River in the Mesabi Range in Minnesota (Seven Beaver Lake) is considered to be the source of the St. Lawrence River. Because it crosses so many lakes, the water system frequently changes its name. From source to mouth, the names are:

The St. Lawrence River also passes through Lake Saint-Louis and Lake Saint-Pierre in Quebec.

Works
The St. Lawrence River is at the heart of many Quebec novels (Anne Hébert's Kamouraska, Réjean Ducharme's L'avalée des avalés), poems (in works of Pierre Morency, Bernard Pozier), and songs (Leonard Cohen's "Suzanne", Michel Rivard's "L'oubli", Joe Dassin's "Dans les yeux d'Émilie", and André Gagnon's "Le Saint-Laurent"). The river was the setting for the Canadian television drama series Seaway. The river has also been portrayed in paintings, notably by the Group of Seven. In addition, the river is the namesake of Saint-Laurent Herald at the Canadian Heraldic Authority.

In 1980 Jacques Cousteau traveled to Canada to make two films on the St. Lawrence River and the Great Lakes, Cries from the Deep and St. Lawrence: Stairway to the Sea.

Musician David Usher released the song "St. Lawrence River" on his Little Songs album in 1998.

The novel and film Black Robe'' are set primarily on the St. Lawrence River during the 17th century.

See also

References

Bibliography

External links

Regional Geography of the St. Lawrence River
Information about Juniper Island (Ontario)
St. Lawrence Parks Commission (Ontario)
Great Lakes St. Lawrence Seaway System
Safe Passage: Aids to Navigation on the St. Lawrence – Historical essay, illustrated with drawings and photographs
Annotated Bibliography on St. Lawrence County and Northern New York region.
International St. Lawrence River Board of Control 
Saint Lawrence River from The Canadian Encyclopedia
St. Lawrence River Cam
Watch the Jacques Cousteau documentary, St. Lawrence: Stairway to the Sea
The Steamboats Sir James Kemp and Lord Dalhousie on the River St. Lawrence, Upper Canada in 1833 by D.J. Kennedy, Historical Society of Pennsylvania

 
 
Physiographic provinces
International rivers of North America
Rivers of New York (state)
Rivers of Ontario
Canada–United States border
Rivers of Montérégie
Rivers of Capitale-Nationale
Rivers of St. Lawrence County, New York
Regions of New York (state)
Rivers of Quebec